Rafael Calixto Escalona Martinez (May 26, 1926 – May 13, 2009) was a Colombian composer and troubadour. He was known for being one of the most prominent vallenato music composers and troubadours of the genre and for being the co-founder of the Vallenato Legend Festival, along with Consuelo Araújo and Alfonso López Michelsen.

He was also a long-time friend of Gabriel García Márquez, who included him in his stories and once told him that his own masterpiece novel, One Hundred Years of Solitude, was just a 350-page Vallenato. Escalona's songs compile the history and stories of the Magdalena Department of the past 20th century. Escalona was an atypical music composer:  he does not play any instruments or sing so his songs can in some ways be difficult to analyze. His songs constitute a legacy of a past generation of Colombians in his memory, a pictorial collage, full of grace, that narrates stories, customs and gossips from his region. He also left a legacy of his loves and pains, humour and poetry. In 1991, Caracol TV produced a television series named Escalona, after him.

Early life
He was born on May 26, 1926 to Colonel Clemente Escalona Labarces, veteran of Thousand Days War and Margarita Martinez Celedon in Patillal. Because Patillal was a village in a rural area surrounded by farms, it was relatively small and there wasn't that much to do after school, other than play with other kids and make up games; build miniature farms or build kites and fly them all day. He had a very happy childhood, and dreamed of becoming a painter or cartoonist, usually drawing funny depictions of classmates and teachers. But his all time friend and classmate, Jaime Molina was better at drawing than him, something that drove him instead, to read poetry and songs. He grew up listening to peasants and  troubadours of the region that often passed by the village bringing news from Valledupar and other regions, since there was no post office or other source of news that arrived at this isolated place.

Youth, the High School Dropout
He moved to Valledupar to attend high school at The Loperena National High School where he composed his first song at the age of fifteen in 1943 called "El profe Castañeda". He wrote the song in honor and sadness of his favourite teacher being transferred to a school in Riohacha, his natural reaction was to dedicate a song to "el viejo Pedro" as he called him, since he grew up listening to local troubadours. His classmates, who were also saddened over the teacher's departure, embraced his song. From then on, he saw himself doing something that he was good at, and started writing songs whenever a situation merged; started composing about his love experiences, about the people that interacted with him or were known in the region and these people's stories of happenings, basically compilations of his everyday experiences and thoughts. In 1945, feeling bored and short of motivation for school, Escalona was transferred to a school in Barranquilla for a short period and then to the Celedon Lyceum High School in Santa Marta, where he composed "El Hambre del Liceo" (the lyceum Hunger), complaining about the poor food quality that the school offered. Tired of school he dropped out and went back to Valledupar.

The Farmer
In Valledupar he devoted his time to working at his parents’ farm and learning about agriculture. He started planting rice. Apparently he also tried to break into the illegal coffee trade by bringing contraband from Aruba with a friend named "Pipe" Socarras. He became a partygoing "parrandero" and a heavy drinker of whiskey and rum. He also started courting many women at once. On April 14, 1951 he finally married Marina Arzuaga Mejía, also known as "La Maye", who would give him six of his presently suspected thirty-six children. (After many years, he would divorce her).

An approach to Politicians
By the 1950s he had become a renowned composer and usually befriended with local political leaders in "parrandas". He always departed with people from Patillal including Hernando Molina, husband of Consuelo Araújo. By the 1960s, when former President of Colombia Alfonso López Michelsen became governor of the newly created Department of Cesar, Lopez was invited to live in Hernando Molina's house. In this "vallenato parrandas" or parties, Escalona, Consuelo Araújo and Lopez decided to create a Vallenato Festival. López also invited them in many occasions to Bogotá, where he organized vallenato parrandas and introduced them to Colombia's political leaders. In 1968 the first Vallenato Legend Festival took place.

Death
He died on the afternoon May 13, 2009 in Bogotá, Colombia due to heart failure. He had been interned for almost two weeks in the Santa Fe Clinic in Bogotá and had been on a medical ventilator and unconscious earlier that day. Before he died Escalona received a visit from the Colombian Ex-President Ernesto Samper Pizano.

Songs
 "El Hambre del Liceo"
 "La casa en el aire"
 "Elegía a Jaime Molina"
 "La vieja sara"
 "El Almirante Padilla"
 "La patillalera"
 "La custodia de Badillo"
 "El villanuevero"
 "El general Dangond"
 "La historia"
 "Honda herida"
 "La brasilera"
 "El arco iris"
 "El perro de Pavajeau"
 "EL jerre jerre"
 "La Privincia"
 "El testamento"
 "El Bachiller"
 "Maria Tere"

See also 
 Guillermo Buitrago

References

External links 
 Rafael Escalona - Daily Telegraph obituary

1926 births
2009 deaths
Colombian diplomats
Colombian musicians
People from Cesar Department
Vallenato musicians
Latin music composers